WSPA-TV (channel 7) is a television station licensed to Spartanburg, South Carolina, United States, serving Upstate South Carolina and Western North Carolina as an affiliate of CBS. It is owned by Nexstar Media Group alongside Asheville, North Carolina–licensed CW owned-and-operated station WYCW (channel 62). WSPA-TV and WYCW share studios on International Drive (next to the I-26 and I-85 Business/Veterans Parkway interchange) in Spartanburg; through a channel sharing agreement, the two stations transmit using WSPA-TV's spectrum from an antenna on Hogback Mountain in northeastern Greenville County (southwest of Tryon, North Carolina).

WSPA-TV is the only station in the market that is headquartered in Spartanburg, and in turn tends to focus its local news stories on that city, with a secondary emphasis on Greenville and Asheville.

History
The station first signed on the air on April 29, 1956. It was founded by broadcasting pioneer Walter J. Brown and his company, Spartan Radiocasting, alongside WSPA radio (950 AM, now WOLI at 910 AM; and 98.9 FM). The station has been a CBS affiliate since its sign-on. Spartan Radiocasting bought several other radio and television stations over the years, and was renamed Spartan Communications in 1995. WSPA began broadcasting a 24-hour schedule in July of that same year, after previously having signed off during the overnight hours on Fridays and Saturdays.

The WSPA radio stations were sold off in 1998, but WSPA-TV remained the flagship of the company until it merged with Media General in 2000. Prior to this, channel 7 was the last remaining locally owned television station in the market.

The station shared some resources with WNEG-TV (now WGTA) in Toccoa, Georgia, while that station was co-owned with WSPA beginning in 1995; this included that station receiving the CBS affiliation for northeast Georgia. This arrangement was terminated after WNEG was sold to the University of Georgia in 2008.

However, WSPA is not carried on cable providers in that area.

On March 1, 2009, WSPA's original tower on Hogback Mountain collapsed due to a combination of heavy icing and high winds, hitting the main auxiliary tower as it fell. WSPA's digital signal was restored using a digital subchannel of sister station WYCW (channel 62); while the station received a replacement antenna on March 4, it was without its analog signal for one week after the accident. A new tower was activated in September 2009.

Prior to the March 2009 tower collapse, WSPA provided grade B coverage as far east as Charlotte. It appeared in the television listings inserts in the Charlotte Observer well into the 1990s, and frequently aired a number of programs pre-empted by Charlotte's WBTV–mostly game shows and cartoons. Before the arrival of the Carolina Panthers, WSPA was known to air a different NFL game than what aired on WBTV, giving Charlotte-area viewers a second option for NFL games. This was especially true when the Atlanta Falcons and Washington Redskins played at the same time; like most CBS affiliates in South Carolina, WSPA tended to favor the Falcons.

On September 8, 2015, Media General announced that it would acquire the Meredith Corporation, owner of WHNS, for $2.4 billion to form Meredith Media General. Since WSPA and WHNS were among the four highest-rated stations in the market in total day viewership, the merged company would have been required to sell either WSPA or WHNS to comply with FCC ownership rules as well as recent changes to those rules regarding same-market television stations that restrict sharing agreements. WYCW was the only one of the three stations affected by the merger that could have been legally acquired by Meredith Media General either by maintaining the existing duopoly with WSPA or by forming a new duopoly with WHNS, as its total day viewership ranks below the top-four ratings threshold. That sale was canceled on January 27, 2016, in favor of a sale of Media General to the Nexstar Broadcasting Group, and WSPA and WYCW became part of "Nexstar Media Group." The deal was approved by the FCC on January 11, 2017, and it was completed on January 17.

Programming
WSPA-TV considerable local news output limits the number of programs the station carries in syndication, with Judge Judy, NCIS (and its New Orleans spinoff), and Storm of Suspicion being the only syndicated programming to air on WSPA-TV, with the latter three airing on late nights on weekends. The station also produces the talk and lifestyle program Your Carolina With Jack & Megan.

WSPA carries the entire CBS network schedule, however it carries only the first half-hour of Face the Nation on Sundays at 10:30 a.m. due to its carriage of televised church services from First Baptist Church of Spartanburg at 11:00 a.m., the second half-hour is seen instead on WYCW; it also splits the CBS Dream Team lineup into two blocks: the final two hours of the block air on a one-hour delay on Saturdays (due to its weekend morning newscast and CBS Saturday Morning) and the first hour airs on a day-behind basis after its Sunday morning newscast. It was also one of a handful of CBS affiliates that aired Let's Make a Deal at 9:00 a.m. instead of the game show's recommended 10:00 a.m. or 3:00 p.m. timeslot in the Eastern Time Zone, but it swapped timeslots with Your Carolina With Jack & Megan and is now seen at 10:00 a.m.

Past programming preemptions and deferrals
From the 1960s through the 1990s, WSPA had preempted several CBS programs; among them were NBA games (during the league's low-rated period, between 1979 and 1981, when CBS showed Finals games on tape delay, although WSPA did carry the 1981 playoffs and NBA Finals), children's programs within the network's Saturday morning lineup including the CBS Children's Film Festival, Muppet Babies (which was preempted by Jack Roper's Kidsizzle from 1991 to 1993), the final season of Pee-Wee's Playhouse and the animated series Bill & Ted's Excellent Adventures.

It also preempted several of the network's game shows including Tattletales (from January to April 1982 with reruns of Carter Country, and then by The Beverly Hillbillies until September 1982; and again from September 1983 onward, after which it was replaced with the hour-long Breakaway), Body Language (which aired on WSPA from September 1984 to January 1985; but was preempted by Breakaway from June to September 1984; The $100,000 Name That Tune from January to September 1985; and Tic Tac Dough from September 1985 to January 1986), Press Your Luck (which was picked up by the station in 1984 shortly after contestant Michael Larson's record $110,237 win; and dropped in January 1986 after Card Sharks took over the 10:30 a.m. slot and replaced Body Language on the schedule; it was replaced with Tic Tac Dough and then by Love Connection from April to September 1986), Card Sharks (which aired on WSPA from 1986 until September 1988, when it was preempted by Wipeout; it returned to the station on March 6, 1989 where it remained until the end of its run), Now You See It (which was preempted by Love Connection from April to July 1989) and the final few months of Family Feud Challenge. The station also preempted Late Show with David Letterman for one week in the summer of 1998.

News operation
WSPA-TV presently broadcasts 36 hours of locally produced newscasts each week (with six hours each weekday and three hours each on Saturdays and Sundays). In addition to its newscasts on channel 7, WSPA-TV also produces an additional 16 hours of newscasts each week on sister station WYCW, two hours from 7:00 to 9:00 a.m. each weekday morning and one hour at 10:00 p.m. each weeknight, and a half-hour each weekend night.

In addition to the main studios in Spartanburg, in January 2017, WSPA/WYCW opened a street front studio in downtown Greenville. Known as "7 On Main", the facility is located at the corner of Main Street and Falls Park Drive. The stations also operate a news bureau on Main Street/SC 28 in Anderson. Nexstar maintains a Capitol bureau in Columbia, covering state government issues for the company's South Carolina stations (WSPA, WBTW in Florence–Myrtle Beach and WCBD in Charleston).

WSPA-TV has won a number of Southeast Regional Emmy Awards in recent years. In 2016, the station won Emmys for Best Morning and Evening Newscasts (Markets 26-75) and repeated with an Emmy for Best Evening Newscast in 2017.

The station's newscasts have been known over the years as Eyewitness 7 News, 7 Eyewitness News, NewsChannel 7, 7 On Your Side and since January 2016 as 7 News. Among the notable former members of the station's news staff were Leeza Gibbons, Jane Robelot and former CBS anchor Susan McGinnis. In 1977, WSPA hired Annette Estes as anchor of its evening newscasts, becoming the station's first female news anchor; Estes left the station in 1987 to become the 6:00 and 11:00 p.m. co-anchor (alongside Carl Clark) at WYFF.

In September 1996, WSPA-TV began to produce a nightly half-hour newscast at 10:00 p.m. for WHNS through a news share agreement with the stations' then-owner Pappas Telecasting Companies; the news share agreement was terminated in 1999 (two years after WHNS was sold to the Meredith Corporation; it is now owned by Gray Television), when channel 21 launched its own news department that fall. On September 16, 2007, WSPA became the first television station in the Greenville/Spartanburg/Asheville market to begin broadcasting its newscasts to high-definition.

Notable former on-air staff
 Leeza Gibbons – reporter (later host of Leeza and Extra)
 Jane Robelot – anchor/reporter (later host of CBS This Morning; now contributing reporter at WYFF and founder of Carolina Zoom Productions)
 Sibila Vargas – morning and noon anchor

Technical information

Subchannels
The station's digital signal is multiplexed:

WSPA previously carried a 24-hour local weather channel on its second digital subchannel, which was branded as "Storm Team 24/7". In 2009, that subchannel became an affiliate of the Retro Television Network. It was replaced with MeTV on September 26, 2011. WSPA dropped MeTV on April 1, 2018; it is now carried by WYFF (channel 4).

Analog-to-digital conversion
WSPA-TV discontinued regular programming on its analog signal, over VHF channel 7, on June 12, 2009, the official date in which full-power television stations in the United States transitioned from analog to digital broadcasts under federal mandate; it continued to broadcast its analog signal despite the March 2009 tower collapse. The station's digital signal relocated from its pre-transition UHF channel 53, which was among the high band UHF channels (52-69) that were removed from broadcasting use as a result of the transition, to its analog-era VHF channel 7.

Translators
In addition to its main signal, WSPA operates a network of 13 translators throughout the mountainous areas of North Carolina. Some translators have applications and/or construction permits to flash-cut from analog to digital, in which they would remain on their existing VHF channel.

Out-of-market cable carriage
In North Carolina, WSPA has been carried on numerous cable outlets in the western portion of the Charlotte market including Hickory, Morganton and Lenoir. Before the tower collapse, it provided grade B coverage as far east as Charlotte itself. It appeared in the Charlotte Observer television listings well into the 1990s. WSPA used to be carried in the western Union County town of Weddington.

On cable in South Carolina, WSPA is carried outside the market in McCormick and Newberry. McCormick is part of the Augusta, Georgia market while Newberry is part of the Columbia market. In January 2009, it was dropped from cable carriage in Rock Hill, which is part of the Charlotte market.

On cable in Georgia, WSPA is carried outside the market in most of Rabun County, which is part of the Atlanta market. WSPA was picked up in 1995 after Atlanta's longtime CBS affiliate, WAGA-TV, became a Fox owned-and-operated station. Atlanta's current CBS affiliate, WANF (formerly WGNX and WGCL-TV), does not have nearly as strong a signal in the more mountainous areas of the Atlanta market.

References

External links

WYCW website

SPA-TV
CBS network affiliates
Television channels and stations established in 1956
1956 establishments in South Carolina
Ion Television affiliates
Nexstar Media Group